The pyrolysis (or devolatilization) process is the thermal decomposition of materials at elevated temperatures, often in an inert atmosphere. It involves a change of chemical composition. The word is coined from the Greek-derived elements pyro "fire", "heat", "fever" and lysis "separating".

Pyrolysis is most commonly used in the treatment of organic materials. It is one of the processes involved in charring wood.  In general, pyrolysis of organic substances produces volatile products and leaves char, a carbon-rich solid residue. Extreme pyrolysis, which leaves mostly carbon as the residue, is called carbonization. Pyrolysis is considered the first step in the processes of gasification or combustion.

The process is used heavily in the chemical industry, for example, to produce ethylene, many forms of carbon, and other chemicals from petroleum, coal, and even wood, or to produce coke from coal. It is used also in the conversion of natural gas (primarily methane) into  hydrogen gas and solid carbon char, recently introduced on an industrial scale. Aspirational applications of pyrolysis would convert biomass into syngas and biochar, waste plastics back into usable oil, or waste into safely disposable substances.

Terminology
Pyrolysis is one of the various types of chemical degradation processes that occur at higher temperatures (above the boiling point of water or other solvents). It differs from other processes like combustion and hydrolysis in that it usually does not involve the addition of other reagents such as oxygen (O2, in combustion) or water (in hydrolysis). Pyrolysis produces solids (char), condensable liquids (tar), and uncondensing/permanent gasses.

Types
Specific types of pyrolysis include: 
 Carbonization, the complete pyrolysis of organic matter, which usually leaves a solid residue that consists mostly of elemental carbon.
 Methane pyrolysis, the direct conversion of methane to hydrogen fuel and separable solid carbon, sometimes using molten metal catalysts.
 Hydrous pyrolysis, in the presence of superheated water or steam, producing hydrogen and substantial atmospheric carbon dioxide.
 Dry distillation, as in the original production of sulfuric acid from sulfates.
 Destructive distillation, as in the manufacture of charcoal, coke and activated carbon.
 Caramelization of sugars.
 High-temperature cooking processes such as roasting, frying, toasting, and grilling.
 Charcoal burning, the production of charcoal.
 Tar production by destructive distillation of wood in tar kilns.
 Cracking of heavier hydrocarbons into lighter ones, as in oil refining.
 Thermal depolymerization, which breaks down plastics and other polymers into monomers and oligomers.
 Ceramization involving the formation of polymer derived ceramics from preceramic polymers under an inert atmosphere.
 Catagenesis, the natural conversion of buried organic matter to fossil fuels.
 Flash vacuum pyrolysis, used in organic synthesis.

General processes and mechanisms 

Pyrolysis generally consists in heating the material above its decomposition temperature, breaking chemical bonds in its molecules.  The fragments usually become smaller molecules, but may combine to produce residues with larger molecular mass, even amorphous covalent solids.

In many settings, some amounts of oxygen, water, or other substances may be present, so that combustion, hydrolysis, or other chemical processes may occur besides pyrolysis proper.  Sometimes those chemicals are added intentionally, as in the burning of firewood, in the traditional manufacture of charcoal, and in the steam cracking of crude oil.

Conversely, the starting material may be heated in a vacuum or in an inert atmosphere to avoid chemical side reactions (such as combustion or hydrolysis).  Pyrolysis in a vacuum also lowers the boiling point of the byproducts, improving their recovery.

When organic matter is heated at increasing temperatures in open containers, the following processes generally occur, in successive or overlapping stages:

 Below about 100 °C, volatiles, including some water, evaporate. Heat-sensitive substances, such as vitamin C and proteins, may partially change or decompose already at this stage. 
 At about 100 °C or slightly higher, any remaining water that is merely absorbed in the material is driven off. This process consumes a lot of energy, so the temperature may stop rising until all water has evaporated. Water trapped in crystal structure of hydrates may come off at somewhat higher temperatures. 
 Some solid substances, like fats, waxes, and sugars, may melt and separate.
 Between 100 and 500 °C, many common organic molecules break down. Most sugars start decomposing at 160–180 °C. Cellulose, a major component of wood, paper, and cotton fabrics, decomposes at about 350 °C. Lignin, another major wood component, starts decomposing at about 350 °C, but continues releasing volatile products up to 500 °C. The decomposition products usually include water, carbon monoxide  and/or carbon dioxide , as well as a large number of organic compounds.  Gases and volatile products leave the sample, and some of them may condense again as smoke. Generally, this process also absorbs energy. Some volatiles may ignite and burn, creating a visible flame. The non-volatile residues typically become richer in carbon and form large disordered molecules, with colors ranging between brown and black. At this point the matter is said to have been "charred" or "carbonized".
 At 200–300 °C, if oxygen has not been excluded, the carbonaceous residue may start to burn, in a highly exothermic reaction, often with no or little visible flame. Once carbon combustion starts, the temperature rises spontaneously, turning the residue into a glowing ember and releasing carbon dioxide and/or monoxide. Sulfur and other elements like chlorine and arsenic may be oxidized and volatilized at this stage.
 Once combustion of the carbonaceous residue is complete, a powdery or solid mineral residue (ash) is often left behind, consisting of inorganic oxidized materials of high melting point. Some of the ash may have left during combustion, entrained by the gases as fly ash or particulate emissions.  Metals present in the original matter usually remain in the ash as oxides or carbonates, such as potash. Phosphorus, from materials such as bone, phospholipids, and nucleic acids, usually remains as phosphates.

Occurrence and uses

Cooking

Pyrolysis has many applications in food preparation. Caramelization is the pyrolysis of sugars in food (often after the sugars have been produced by the breakdown of polysaccharides). The food goes brown and changes flavor. The distinctive flavors are used in many dishes; for instance, caramelized onion is used in French onion soup. The temperatures needed for caramelization lie above the boiling point of water. Frying oil can easily rise above the boiling point. Putting a lid on the frying pan keeps the water in, and some of it re-condenses, keeping the temperature too cool to brown for longer time.

Pyrolysis of food can also be undesirable, as in the charring of burnt food (at temperatures too low for the oxidative combustion of carbon to produce flames and burn the food to ash).

Coke, carbon, charcoals, and chars 

Carbon and carbon-rich materials have desirable properties but are nonvolatile, even at high temperatures. Consequently, pyrolysis is used to produce many kinds of carbon; these can be used for fuel, as reagents in steelmaking (coke), and as structural materials.

Charcoal is a less smoky fuel than pyrolyzed wood. Some cities ban, or used to ban, wood fires; when residents only use charcoal (and similarly-treated rock coal, called coke) air pollution is significantly reduced. In cities where people do not generally cook or heat with fires, this is not needed. In the mid-20th century, "smokeless" legislation in Europe required cleaner-burning techniques, such as coke fuel and smoke-burning incinerators as an effective measure to reduce air pollution

The coke-making or "coking" process consists of heating the material in "coking ovens" to very high temperatures (up to ) so that the molecules are broken down into lighter volatile substances, which leave the vessel, and a porous but hard residue that is mostly carbon and inorganic ash. The amount of volatiles varies with the source material, but is typically 25–30% of it by weight. High temperature pyrolysis is used on an industrial scale to convert coal into coke. This is useful in metallurgy, where the higher temperatures are necessary for many processes, such as steelmaking. Volatile by-products of this process are also often useful, including benzene and pyridine.  Coke can also be produced from the solid residue left from petroleum refining.

The original vascular structure of the wood and the pores created by escaping gases combine to produce a light and porous material. By starting with a dense wood-like material, such as nutshells or peach stones, one obtains a form of charcoal with particularly fine pores (and hence a much larger pore surface area), called activated carbon, which is used as an adsorbent for a wide range of chemical substances.

Biochar is the residue of incomplete organic pyrolysis, e.g., from cooking fires.  It is a key component of the terra preta soils associated with ancient indigenous communities of the Amazon basin. Terra preta is much sought by local farmers for its superior fertility and capacity to promote and retain an enhanced suite of beneficial microbiota, compared to the typical red soil of the region. Efforts are underway to recreate these soils through biochar, the solid residue of pyrolysis of various materials, mostly organic waste.

Carbon fibers are filaments of carbon that can be used to make very strong yarns and textiles. Carbon fiber items are often produced by spinning and weaving the desired item from fibers of a suitable polymer, and then pyrolyzing the material at a high temperature (from ).  The first carbon fibers were made from rayon, but polyacrylonitrile has become the most common starting material. For their first workable electric lamps, Joseph Wilson Swan and Thomas Edison used carbon filaments made by pyrolysis of cotton yarns and bamboo splinters, respectively.

Pyrolysis is the reaction used to coat a preformed substrate with a layer of pyrolytic carbon. Pyrolytic carbon coatings are used in many applications, including artificial heart valves.

Liquid and gaseous biofuels 

Pyrolysis is the basis of several methods for producing fuel from biomass, i.e. lignocellulosic biomass. Crops studied as biomass feedstock for pyrolysis include native North American prairie grasses such as switchgrass and bred versions of other grasses such as Miscantheus giganteus. Other sources of organic matter as feedstock for pyrolysis include greenwaste, sawdust, waste wood, leaves, vegetables, nut shells, straw, cotton trash, rice hulls, and orange peels. Animal waste including poultry litter, dairy manure, and potentially other manures are also under evaluation. Some industrial byproducts are also suitable feedstock including paper sludge, distillers grain, and sewage sludge.

In the biomass components, the pyrolysis of hemicellulose happens between 210 and 310 °C. The pyrolysis of cellulose starts from 300–315 °C and ends at 360–380 °C, with a peak at 342–354 °C. Lignin starts to decompose at about 200 °C and continues until 1000 °C.

Synthetic diesel fuel by pyrolysis of organic materials is not yet economically competitive.

Syngas is usually produced by pyrolysis.

The low quality of oils produced through pyrolysis can be improved by physical and chemical processes, which might drive up production costs, but may make sense economically as circumstances change.

There is also the possibility of integrating with other processes such as mechanical biological treatment and anaerobic digestion.  Fast pyrolysis is also investigated for biomass conversion.  Fuel bio-oil can also be produced by hydrous pyrolysis.

Methane pyrolysis for hydrogen

Methane pyrolysis is a industrial process for "turquoise" hydrogen production from methane by removing solid carbon from natural gas. This one-step process produces hydrogen in high volume at low cost (less than steam reforming with carbon sequestration). Only water is released when hydrogen is used as the fuel for fuel-cell electric heavy truck transportation,
 gas turbine electric power generation, and hydrogen for industrial processes including producing ammonia fertilizer and cement. Methane pyrolysis is the process operating around 1065 °C for producing hydrogen from natural gas that allows removal of carbon easily (solid carbon is a byproduct of the process). The industrial quality solid carbon can then be sold or landfilled and is not released into the atmosphere, avoiding emission of greenhouse gas (GHG) or ground water pollution from a landfill. In 2015, a company called Monolith Materials built a pilot plant in Redwood City, CA to study scaling Methane Pyrolysis using renewable power in the process.  A successful pilot project then led to a larger commercial scale demonstration plant in Hallam, Nebraska in 2016.  As of 2020, this plant is operational and can produce around 14 metric tons of hydrogen per day.  In 2021, the US Department of Energy backed Monolith Materials’ plans for major expansion with a $1B loan guarantee.  The funding will help produce a plant capable of generating 164 metric tons of hydrogen per day by 2024.  Pilots with gas utilities and biogas plants are underway with companies like Modern Electron.  Volume production is also being evaluated in the BASF "methane pyrolysis at scale" pilot plant, the chemical engineering team at University of California - Santa Barbara and in such research laboratories as Karlsruhe Liquid-metal Laboratory (KALLA). Power for process heat consumed is only one seventh of the power consumed in the water electrolysis method for producing hydrogen.

Ethylene
Pyrolysis is used to produce ethylene, the chemical compound produced on the largest scale industrially (>110 million tons/year in 2005). The resulting ethylene is used to make antifreeze (ethylene glycol), PVC (via vinyl chloride), and many other polymers, such as polyethylene and polystyrene.

Semiconductors 

The process of metalorganic vapour-phase epitaxy (MOCVD) entails pyrolysis of volatile organometallic compounds to give semiconductors, hard coatings, and other applicable materials. The reactions entail thermal degradation of precursors, with deposition of the inorganic component and release of the hydrocarbons as gaseous waste. Since it is an atom-by-atom deposition, these atoms organize themselves into crystals to form the bulk semiconductor. Silicon chips are produced by the pyrolysis of silane:
SiH4  →  Si  +  2 H2. 
Gallium arsenide, another semiconductor, forms upon co-pyrolysis of trimethylgallium and arsine.

Waste management

Pyrolysis can also be used to treat municipal solid waste and plastic waste.  The main advantage is the reduction in volume of the waste. In principle, pyrolysis will regenerate the monomers (precursors) to the polymers that are treated, but in practice the process is neither a clean nor an economically competitive source of monomers.

In tire waste management, tire pyrolysis is a well-developed technology.
Other products from car tire pyrolysis include steel wires, carbon black and bitumen. The area faces legislative, economic, and marketing obstacles. Oil derived from tire rubber pyrolysis has a high sulfur content, which gives it high potential as a pollutant; consequently it should be desulfurized.

Alkaline pyrolysis of sewage sludge at low temperature of 500 °C can enhance H2 production with in-situ carbon capture. The use of NaOH (sodium hydroxide) has the potential to produce H2-rich gas that can be used for fuels cells directly.

In early November 2021, the U.S. State of Georgia announced a joint effort with Igneo Technologies to build an $85 million large electronics recycling plant in the Port of Savannah. The project will focus on lower-value, plastics-heavy devices in the waste stream using multiple shredders and furnaces using pyrolysis technology.

One-stepwise pyrolysis and Two-stepwise pyrolysis for Tobacco Waste 
Pyrolysis has also been used for trying to mitigate tobacco waste. One method was done where tobacco waste was separated into two categories TLW (Tobacco Leaf Waste) and TSW (Tobacco Stick Waste). TLW was determined to be any waste from cigarettes and TSW was determined to be any waste from electronic cigarettes.  Both TLW and TSW were dried at 80 °C for 24 hours and stored in a desiccator. Samples were grounded so that the contents were uniform. Tobacco Waste (TW) also contains inorganic (metal) contents, which was determined using an inductively coupled plasma-optical spectrometer. Thermo-gravimetric analysis was used to thermally degrade four samples (TLW, TSW, glycerol, and guar gum) and monitored under specific dynamic temperature conditions. About one gram of both TLW and TSW were used in the pyrolysis tests. During these analysis tests, CO2 and N2 were used as atmospheres inside of a tubular reactor that was built using quartz tubing. For both CO2 and N2 atmospheres the flow rate was 100 mL min-1. External heating was created via a tubular furnace. The pyrogenic products were classified into three phases. The first phase was biochar, a solid residue produced by the reactor at 650 °C. The second phase liquid hydrocarbons were collected by a cold solvent trap and sorted by using chromatography. The third and final phase was analyzed using an online micro GC unit and those pyrolysates were gases. 

Two different types of experiments were conducted: one-stepwise pyrolysis and two-stepwise pyrolysis. One-stepwise pyrolysis consisted of a constant heating rate (10 °C min-1) from 30 to 720 °C. In the second step of the two-stepwise pyrolysis test the pyrolysates from the one-stepwise pyrolysis were pyrolyzed in the second heating zone which was controlled isothermally at 650 °C. The two-stepwise pyrolysis was used to focus primarily on how well CO2 affects carbon redistribution when adding heat through the second heating zone. 

First noted was the thermolytic behaviors of TLW and TSW in both the CO2 and N2 environments. For both TLW and TSW the thermolytic behaviors were identical at less than or equal to 660 °C in the CO2 and N2 environments. The differences between the environments start to occur when temperatures increase above 660 °C and the residual mass percentages significantly decrease in the CO2 environment compared to that in the N2 environment. This observation is likely due to the Boudouard reaction, where we see spontaneous gasification happening when temperatures exceed 710 °C. Although these observations were seen at temperatures lower than 710 °C it is most likely due to the catalytic capabilities of inorganics in TLW. It was further investigated by doing ICP-OES measurements and found that a fifth of the residual mass percentage was Ca species. CaCO3 is used in cigarette papers and filter material, leading to the explanation that degradation of CaCO3 causes pure CO2 reacting with CaO in a dynamic equilibrium state. This being the reason for seeing mass decay between 660 °C and 710 °C. Differences in differential thermogram (DTG) peaks for TLW were compared to TSW. TLW had four distinctive peaks at 87, 195, 265, and 306 °C whereas TSW had two major drop offs at 200 and 306 °C with one spike in between. The four peaks indicated that TLW contains more diverse types of additives than TSW. The residual mass percentage between TLW and TSW was further compared, where the residual mass in TSW was less than that of TLW for both CO2 and N2 environments concluding that TSW has higher quantities of additives than TLW. 

The one-stepwise pyrolysis experiment showed different results for the CO2 and N2 environments. During this process the evolution of 5 different notable gases were observed. Hydrogen, Methane, Ethane, Carbon Dioxide, and Ethylene all are produced when the thermolytic rate of TLW began to be retarded at greater than or equal to 500 °C. Thermolytic rate begins at the same temperatures for both the CO2 and N2 environment but there is higher concentration of the production of Hydrogen, Ethane, Ethylene, and Methane in the N2 environment than that in the CO2 environment. The concentration of CO in the CO2 environment is significantly greater as temperatures increase past 600 °C and this is due to CO2 being liberated from CaCO3 in TLW. This significant increase in CO concentration is why there is lower concentrations of other gases produced in the CO2 environment due to a dilution effect. Since pyrolysis is the re-distribution of carbons in carbon substrates into three pyrogenic products. The CO2 environment is going to be more effective because the CO2 reduction into CO allows for the oxidation of pyrolysates to form CO. In conclusion the CO2 environment allows a higher yield of gases than oil and biochar. When the same process is done for TSW the trends are almost identical therefore the same explanations can be applied to the pyrolysis of TSW.

Harmful chemicals were reduced in the CO2 environment due to CO formation causing tar to be reduced. One-stepwise pyrolysis was not that effective on activating CO2 on carbon rearrangement due to the high quantities of liquid pyrolysates (tar). Two-stepwise pyrolysis for the CO2 environment allowed for greater concentrations of gases due to the second heating zone. The second heating zone was at a consistent temperature of 650 °C isothermally. More reactions between CO2 and gaseous pyrolysates with longer residence time meant that CO2 could further convert pyrolysates into CO. The results showed that the two-stepwise pyrolysis was an effective way to decrease tar content and increase gas concentration by about 10 wt.% for both TLW (64.20 wt.%) and TSW (73.71%).

Thermal cleaning 

Pyrolysis is also used for thermal cleaning, an industrial application to remove organic substances such as polymers, plastics and coatings from parts, products or production components like extruder screws, spinnerets and static mixers. During the thermal cleaning process, at temperatures between 310 C° to 540 C° (600 °F to 1000 °F), organic material is converted by pyrolysis and oxidation into volatile organic compounds, hydrocarbons and carbonized gas. Inorganic elements remain.

Several types of thermal cleaning systems use pyrolysis:
 Molten Salt Baths belong to the oldest thermal cleaning systems; cleaning with a molten salt bath is very fast but implies the risk of dangerous splatters, or other potential hazards connected with the use of salt baths, like explosions or highly toxic hydrogen cyanide gas.
 Fluidized Bed Systems use sand or aluminium oxide as heating medium; these systems also clean very fast but the medium does not melt or boil, nor emit any vapors or odors; the cleaning process takes one to two hours.
 Vacuum Ovens use pyrolysis in a vacuum avoiding uncontrolled combustion inside the cleaning chamber; the cleaning process takes 8 to 30 hours.
 Burn-Off Ovens, also known as Heat-Cleaning Ovens, are gas-fired and used in the painting, coatings, electric motors and plastics industries for removing organics from heavy and large metal parts.

Fine chemical synthesis
Pyrolysis is used in the production of chemical compounds, mainly, but not only, in the research laboratory.

The area of boron-hydride clusters started with the study of the pyrolysis of diborane (B2H6) at ca. 200 °C.  Products include the clusters  pentaborane and decaborane. These pyrolyses involve not only cracking (to give H2), but also recondensation.

The synthesis of nanoparticles, zirconia and oxides utilizing an ultrasonic nozzle in a process called ultrasonic spray pyrolysis (USP).

Other uses and occurrences
 Pyrolysis is used to turn organic materials into carbon for the purpose of carbon-14 dating.
 Pyrolysis of tobacco, paper, and additives, in cigarettes and other products, generates many volatile products (including nicotine, carbon monoxide, and tar) that are responsible for the aroma and negative health effects of smoking.  Similar considerations apply to the smoking of marijuana and the burning of incense products and mosquito coils.
 Pyrolysis occurs during the incineration of trash, potentially generating volatiles that are toxic or contribute to air pollution if not completely burned.
 Laboratory or industrial equipment sometimes gets fouled by carbonaceous residues that result from coking, the pyrolysis of organic products that come into contact with hot surfaces.

PAHs generation 
Polycyclic aromatic hydrocarbons (PAHs) can be generated from the pyrolysis of different solid waste fractions, such as hemicellulose, cellulose, lignin, pectin, starch, polyethylene (PE), polystyrene (PS), polyvinyl chloride (PVC), and polyethylene terephthalate (PET). PS, PVC, and lignin generate significant amount of PAHs. Naphthalene is the most abundant PAH among all the polycyclic aromatic hydrocarbons.

When the temperature is increased from 500 to 900 °C, most PAHs increase. With increasing temperature, the percentage of light PAHs decreases and the percentage of heavy PAHs increases.

Study tools

Thermogravimetric analysis 
Thermogravimetric analysis (TGA) is one of the most common techniques to investigate pyrolysis with no limitations of heat and mass transfer. The results can be used to determine mass loss kinetics. Activation energies can be calculated using the Kissinger method or peak analysis-least square method (PA-LSM).

TGA can couple with Fourier-transform infrared spectroscopy (FTIR) and mass spectrometry. As the temperature increases, the volatiles generated from pyrolysis can be measured.

Macro-TGA 
In TGA, the sample is loaded first before the increase of temperature, and the heating rate is low (less than 100 °C min−1). Macro-TGA can use gram-scale samples, which can be used to investigate the pyrolysis with mass and heat transfer effects.

Pyrolysis–gas chromatography–mass spectrometry 
Pyrolysis mass spectrometry (Py-GC-MS) is an important laboratory procedure to determine the structure of compounds.

History

Pyrolysis has been used for turning wood into charcoal since ancient times. The ancient Egyptians used methanol, which they obtained from the pyrolysis of wood, in their embalming process. The dry distillation of wood remained the major source of methanol into the early 20th century.

Pyrolysis was instrumental in the discovery of many chemical substances, such as phosphorus from ammonium sodium hydrogen phosphate  in concentrated urine, oxygen from mercuric oxide, and various nitrates.

See also

Dextrin
Gasification
Hydrogen
Hydrogen production
Karrick process
Pyrolytic coating
Thermal decomposition
Torrefaction
Wood gas

References

External links

 In Situ Catalytic Fast Pyrolysis Technology Pathway National Renewable Energy Laboratory

 
Organic reactions
Chemical processes
Industrial processes
Oil shale technology
Biodegradable waste management
Waste treatment technology
Fire protection